The 1906 Harvard Crimson football team represented Harvard University in the 1906 college football season. The Crimson finished with a 10–1 record under second-year head coach Bill Reid. The team won its first ten games by a combined 167–20 score, but lost its final game against rival Yale by a 6–0 score.  Walter Camp selected only one Harvard player, guard Francis Burr, as a first-team player on his 1906 College Football All-America Team.  Caspar Whitney selected two Harvard players as first-team members of his All-America team: Burr and tackle Charles Osborne.

Schedule

References

Harvard
Harvard Crimson football seasons
Harvard Crimson football
1900s in Boston